McAuliffe (surname)

Other meanings 
 McAuliffe (crater), a lunar crater named after astronaut Christa McAuliffe
 3352 McAuliffe, an asteroid named after astronaut Christa McAuliffe
 Christa McAuliffe Fellowship Program
 Christa McAuliffe School, elementary and middle school in Saratoga, California
 Christa McAuliffe Space Education Center, Pleasant Grove, Utah
 McAuliffe-Shepard Discovery Center, planetarium in Concord, New Hampshire